Forfeiture Endangers American Rights (F.E.A.R.) is an organization in the United States dedicated to stopping abuse of asset forfeiture, the practice whereby governments seize tangible and financial assets alleged to have been used in the commission of certain crimes. It is a 501(c)(3) charitable organization located in Mill Valley, California. Its president is Brenda Grantland since 1998.

See also
 Civil forfeiture in the United States

References

External links
 

Political advocacy groups in the United States
Government watchdog groups in the United States
Drug policy organizations based in the United States
Asset forfeiture